Waltham is an unincorporated community located on E. 8th Road in Waltham Township in LaSalle County, Illinois, United States, approximately six miles north of Utica. It contains a church, several homes, and a school constructed in the 1960s.

References

Unincorporated communities in Illinois
Unincorporated communities in LaSalle County, Illinois
Ottawa, IL Micropolitan Statistical Area
Populated places established in the 1960s